Sergei Konstantinovich Krikalev (also transliterated as Sergei Krikalyov; born 27 August 1958) is a Russian mechanical engineer, former cosmonaut and former head of the Yuri Gagarin Cosmonaut Training Center.

As a prominent rocket scientist, he is a veteran of six space flights and ranks third to Gennady Padalka and Yuri Malenchenko for the most time spent in space: a total of 803 days, 9 hours, and 39 minutes.

Krikalev was stranded on board the Mir during the dissolution of the Soviet Union. As the country that had sent him into space no longer existed, his return was delayed and he stayed in space for 311 consecutive days, twice as long as the mission had originally called for.

He retired as a cosmonaut in 2007 and was working as vice president of Space Corporation Energia. From 2009 to 2014, he headed the Yuri Gagarin Cosmonaut Training Center.

Biography 
Krikalev was born in Leningrad in the Soviet Union (now Saint Petersburg, Russia). He enjoyed swimming, skiing, cycling, aerobatic flying, and amateur radio operations, particularly from space (callsign U5MIR). He graduated from high school in 1975. In 1981, he received a mechanical engineering degree from the Leningrad Mechanical Institute, now called Baltic State Technical University.

After graduation in 1981, he joined NPO Energia, the Russian industrial organization responsible for manned space flight activities. He tested space flight equipment, developed space operations methods, and participated in ground control operations. When the Salyut 7 space station failed in 1985, he worked on the rescue mission team, developing procedures for docking with the uncontrolled station and repairing the station's on-board system.

Mir 
Krikalev was selected as a cosmonaut in 1985, completed his basic training in 1986, and, for a time, was assigned to the Buran Shuttle program. In early 1988, he began training for his first long-duration flight aboard the Mir space station.

This training included preparations for at least six EVAs (space walks), installation of a new module, the first test of the new Manned Maneuvering Unit (MMU), and the second joint Soviet-French science mission. Soyuz TM-7 was launched on 26 November 1988, with Krikalev as flight engineer, Commander Aleksandr Volkov, and French astronaut Jean-Loup Chrétien. The previous crew (Vladimir Titov, Musa Manarov, and Valeri Polyakov) remained on Mir for another 25 days, marking the longest period a six-person crew had been in orbit. After the previous crew returned to Earth, Krikalev, Polyakov, and Volkov continued to conduct experiments aboard the Mir station. Because arrival of the next crew had been delayed, they prepared the Mir for a period of unmanned operations before returning to Earth on 27 April 1989.

In April 1990, Krikalev began preparing for his second flight as a member of the backup crew for the eighth long-duration Mir mission, which also included five EVAs and a week of Soviet-Japanese operations. In December 1990, Krikalev began training for the ninth Mir mission which included training for ten EVAs. Soyuz TM-12 launched on 19 May 1991, with Krikalev as flight engineer, Commander Anatoly Artsebarsky, and British astronaut Helen Sharman. Sharman returned to Earth with the following crew after one week, while Krikalev and Artsebarsky remained on Mir. During the summer, they conducted six EVAs to perform a variety of experiments and some station maintenance tasks.

In July 1991, Krikalev agreed to stay on Mir as flight engineer for the next crew, scheduled to arrive in October because the next two planned flights had been reduced to one. The engineer slot on the Soyuz TM-13 flight on 2 October 1991, was filled by Toktar Aubakirov, an astronaut from the Kazakh Soviet Socialist Republic, who had not been trained for a long-duration mission. Both Aubakirov and Franz Viehböck, the first Austrian astronaut, returned with Artsebarsky on 10 October 1991. Commander Alexander Volkov remained on board with Krikalev. After the crew replacement in October, Volkov and Krikalev continued Mir experiment operations and conducted another EVA before returning to Earth on 25 March 1992.

Throughout his various missions aboard Mir, Krikalev regularly communicated with various amateur radio operators (hams) across the globe. A particularly lengthy relationship was formed between Krikalev and amateur radio operator Margaret Iaquinto. At one point during one of his stays in space, he contacted her once a day for an entire year. Krikalev and Iaquinto successfully communicated via packet radio for the first time in history between an orbiting space station and an amateur radio operator. They communicated about personal matters, as well as political ones. Iaquinto set up a makeshift digital bulletin board that the Mir cosmonauts would often use to obtain uncensored western news and information regarding the state of the collapsing Soviet Union.

Krikalev was in space when the Soviet Union was dissolved on 26 December 1991. With the Baikonur Cosmodrome and the landing area both being located in the newly independent Kazakhstan, there was a great deal of uncertainty about the fate of his mission. He remained in space twice as long as originally planned, spending a total of 311 days in space. Because Krikalev spent so much time in space away from Earth’s center of gravity, time dilation (or the slowing down of clocks) caused him to be 0.02 seconds younger than other people born at the same time as him. He returned to Earth on 25 March and is sometimes referred to as the "last Soviet citizen". These events are documented and contextualized in Romanian filmmaker Andrei Ujică's 1995 documentary Out of the Present. Krikalev's story inspired the 2017 film Sergio & Sergei, directed by Ernesto Daranas.

Space Shuttle 

In October 1992, NASA announced that an experienced cosmonaut would fly aboard a future Space Shuttle mission. Krikalev was one of two candidates named by the Russian Space Agency for mission specialist training with the crew of STS-60. In April 1993, he was assigned as prime mission specialist. In September 1993, Vladimir Titov was selected to fly on STS-63 with Krikalev training as his back-up.

Krikalev flew on STS-60, the first joint U.S./Russian Space Shuttle Mission. Launched on 3 February 1994, STS-60 was the second flight of the Space Habitation Module-2 (Spacehab-2), and the first flight of the Wake Shield Facility (WSF-1). During the eight-day flight, the crew of Discovery conducted a wide variety of materials science experiments, both on the Wake Shield Facility and in the Spacehab, Earth observation, and life science experiments. Krikalev conducted significant portions of the Remote Manipulator System (RMS) operations during the flight. With the completion of this flight, Krikalev logged an additional eight days, seven hours, nine minutes in space.

Krikalev returned to duty in Russia following his American experience on STS-60. Periodically he returned to the Johnson Space Center in Houston to work with CAPCOM in Mission Control and ground controllers in Russia supporting joint U.S./Russian Missions STS-63, STS-71, STS-74 and STS-76.

Krikalev and Robert Cabana became the first people to enter the ISS in December 1998, when they turned on the lights in the US module Unity.

Krikalev flew on STS-88 Endeavour (4–15 December 1998), the first International Space Station assembly mission. During the 12-day mission the Unity module was mated with Zarya module. Two crew members performed three space walks to connect umbilicals and attach tools and hardware for use in future EVAs. The crew also performed IMAX Cargo Bay Camera (ICBC) operations, and deployed two satellites, Mighty Sat 1 and SAC-A. The mission was accomplished in 185 orbits of the Earth in 283 hours and 18 minutes.

International Space Station 
Krikalev was a member of the Expedition 1 crew. They launched 31 October 2000, on a Soyuz rocket from Baikonur Cosmodrome in Kazakhstan, successfully docking with the station on 2 November 2000. During their stay on the station they prepared the inside of the orbital outpost for future crews. They also saw the station grow in size with the installation of the U.S. solar array structure and the U.S. Destiny Laboratory Module. They left the station with the STS-102 crew, undocking from the station on 18 March with landing at the Kennedy Space Center, Florida, on 21 March 2001.

Krikalev was also the commander of Expedition 11. He lived and worked aboard the International Space Station on a six-month tour of duty. This was the third time he had flown to the International Space Station. Expedition 11 launched from Baikonur Cosmodrome in Kazakhstan on 14 April 2005 aboard a Soyuz spacecraft and docked with the ISS on 16 April 2005. Following eight days of joint operations and handover briefings, they replaced the Expedition 10 crew who returned to earth aboard Soyuz. Expedition 11 plans called for two spacewalks, the first in August from the US Quest airlock in US spacesuits, and the second, in September, in Russian spacesuits from the Pirs airlock. On 16 August 2005 at 1:44 a.m. EDT he passed the record of 748 days in space held by Sergei Avdeyev.

Expedition 11 undocked from the ISS on 10 October 2005 at 5:49 p.m. EDT and landed in Kazakhstan on 10 October 2005 at 9:09 p.m. EDT. They were replaced by William S. McArthur and Valeri Tokarev, the crew of Expedition 12.

In completing his sixth space flight, Krikalev logged 803 days and 9 hours and 39 minutes in space, including eight EVAs. He is currently third to Gennady Padalka and Yuri Malenchenko in the record for the most time spent in space.

Krikalev's contributions to the ISS were not limited to his on-orbit time. On 15 June 2007, Krikalev was brought to the Russian Mission Control center to instruct Expedition 15 Flight Engineer Oleg Kotov on how he and ISS Commander Fyodor Yurchikhin could jump-start the Russian segment's crippled computer systems.

Later career 
On 15 February 2007, Krikalev was appointed Vice President of the S.P. Korolev Rocket and Space Corporation Energia (Russian: Ракетно-космическая корпорация "Энергия" им. С.П.Королева) in charge of manned space flights. In that office, he was the administrator of the Yuri Gagarin Cosmonaut Training Center from 2009 to 2014.

In popular culture 
A character based on Krikalev features in the 2017 Cuban film drama Sergio and Sergei, in which a professor and amateur radio enthusiast in Havana contacts a cosmonaut named Sergei aboard the Mir space station. The film draws parallels between economic hardships in Cuba at the time and the fall of the Soviet Union, which occurred as the real-life Krikalev was aboard Mir.

Chilean rock band Fulano composed a song after him, named Krikalev, included in their 1997 album "Trabajos Inútiles" (Useless works).

Missions 
 Soyuz TM-7: Launched 26 November 1988
 Soyuz TM-12: Launched 19 May 1991
 STS-60 Space Shuttle Discovery: Launched 3 February 1994
 STS-88 Space Shuttle Endeavour: Launched 4 December 1998
 ISS Expedition 1: Launched 31 October 2000
 ISS Expedition 11: Launched 14 April 2005

Awards 
He was a member of the Russian and Soviet national aerobatic flying teams, and was Champion of Moscow in 1983, and Champion of the Soviet Union in 1986.

For his contributions to the Russian space program, he was the very first person awarded with the title of Hero of the Russian Federation.

For his space flight experience, he was awarded:
 the title of Hero of the Russian Federation;
 the title of Hero of the Soviet Union (USSR);
 the title of Pilot-Cosmonaut of the USSR (USSR);
 the Order of Lenin (USSR);
 Order For Merit to the Fatherland 4th class;
 Order of Honour;
 Order of Friendship of Peoples (USSR);
 Medal "For Merit in Space Exploration";
 Medal "In Commemoration of the 300th Anniversary of Saint Petersburg".
Foreign awards:
 Officer of the Legion of Honour (France);
 NASA Distinguished Public Service Medal (USA);
 three NASA Space Flight Medals (USA).

He overtook Sergei Avdeyev's previous record for the career total time spent in space (747.59 days) during Expedition 11 to the International Space Station. Krikalev has logged a total of 803 days and 9 hours and 39 minutes in space.

On 23 May 2007 Sergei Krikalev was selected as an honorary citizen of Saint Petersburg together with conductor Valery Gergiev.

Krikalev was one of five cosmonauts selected to raise the Russian flag at the Sochi 2014 Winter Olympics opening ceremony.

See also 
 List of human spaceflights chronologically
 List of ISS spacewalks
 List of Space Shuttle missions
 List of spacewalks and moonwalks

References

External links 
 Energia biography of S. Krikalev 
 NASA biography of S. Krikalev
 Spacefacts biography of S. Krikalev

Heroes of the Soviet Union
Heroes of the Russian Federation
Commanders of the International Space Station
Soviet cosmonauts
Russian cosmonauts
Engineers from Saint Petersburg
1958 births
Living people
Crew members of the International Space Station
Russian mechanical engineers
Recipients of the Order of Lenin
Recipients of the Order of Honour (Russia)
Recipients of the Order of Friendship of Peoples
Recipients of the Medal "For Merit in Space Exploration"
Officiers of the Légion d'honneur
Recipients of the NASA Distinguished Public Service Medal
Space Shuttle program astronauts
Spacewalkers
Mir crew members